Marie Antoinette Sarangaya "Toni" Leviste (born August 5, 1973), is a Filipina equestrian athlete. Leviste represented the Philippines in international competitions, such as the FEI World Cup Show, the Southeast Asian Games, the Asian games and the Summer Olympics. Leviste has also been awarded the Philippine Sportswriters Association (PSA) Rider of the Year award from 1992 until 2005.

Career
Toni Leviste first gained local media attention in 1999 when she won third place in the little-known Sunshine tour grand prix which was held in Jerez de la Frontera, Spain. In the same year, she competed at the World Cup Showjumping Finals, held at Goteborg, Sweden. During this time, she was the first equestrian to represent a country within the Southeast Asian region in the World Cup. Leviste then went on to represent her country in the 2000 Summer Olympics at Sydney, Australia, though eventually finishing at 61st place and failing to medal, she noted that it was more important for her during that time to take part in the games rather than winning. Leviste competed again in the 2008 summer games and is currently preparing for a final run at the 2012 London Olympics. At the 2002 Asian games, Leviste alongside Mikee Cojuangco-Jaworski won team silver in the team jumping event. She has also won several regional tournaments, such as winning the 2004 Globe Platinum Cup in Manila, the 2004 Merdeka Masters in Kuala Lumpur, Malaysia, the 2005 Sony Ericsson Cup in Manila and the 2005 Malaysian Open in Kuwang, Malaysia. Her last major tournament win was in 2008 when she won first place in the CSI-Dinard young horse competition in Dinard, France. In 2010, she was initially named to the Philippines team for the Asian Games in Guangzhou, China, but she did not compete because the Philippine Olympic Committee decided not to field an equestrian team in order to avoid the high cost of transporting horses to the games.

Equestrian park
Leviste opened a 5-hectare Equestrian park in the outskirts of Lipa city, Batangas. The facility, which Leviste describes as a "horse spa", includes  a "European-style" barn and grass paddocks where horses can graze individually or communally. The facility also has a manor house in which athletes can be housed while training in the facility.

Personal life
Toni Leviste is the daughter of former Batangas Governor Antonio Leviste and his first wife Celia Sarangaya. She has been a practicing Muslim since 2004 and has been active in the World Islamic Economic Forum since 2010. Leviste has also been featured as an image model for local Philippine clothing brands such as Bayo, Freeway, Tango and other popular brands  like Globe Telecom, Sony Ericsson, Cebuana Lhullier and Clinique.

References

1973 births
Living people
Sportspeople from Manila
Filipino female equestrians
Equestrians at the 2000 Summer Olympics
Olympic equestrians of the Philippines
Equestrians at the 1998 Asian Games
Equestrians at the 2002 Asian Games
Equestrians at the 2006 Asian Games
Equestrians at the 2014 Asian Games
Equestrians at the 2018 Asian Games
Asian Games silver medalists for the Philippines
Asian Games medalists in equestrian
Medalists at the 2002 Asian Games
Southeast Asian Games gold medalists for the Philippines
Southeast Asian Games silver medalists for the Philippines
Southeast Asian Games medalists in equestrian
Competitors at the 2005 Southeast Asian Games